Chile has produced stamps for national use since 1853. The first stamps of Chile were inscribed Colon Chile.

In 1894, Chile was one of the few countries to issue a stamp for the Avis de réception service.

See also
List of people on stamps of Chile

References

External links
Chile: The Airmails 1927-1937

Philately of Chile